Second Childhood is a 1936 Our Gang short comedy film directed by Gus Meins.  It was the 144th Our Gang short that was released.

Plot
On the occasion of her 65th birthday, a crotchety hypochondriac (Zeffie Tilbury) goes through her daily rant as her snooty servants ply her with colorful but unnecessary pills. Her "celebration" is interrupted when a toy plane owned by the gang crashes through her dining room window and shatters a vase. Forced to do the old lady's yardwork to pay for the damage, the kids ever so gradually win her heart, mostly by refusing to mollycoddle her as her servants have done for so many years.

Before long, the gang's new "Grandma" is singing along with Spanky and Alfalfa, demolishing her pill bottles with a slingshot, embarking upon a wild roller-skate ride through her drafty mansion—and having the time of her life in the process.

Production notes
Unbeknownst to the cast, Zeffie Tilbury was blind. In between takes, she was led around by her staff. This would be the last episode directed by Gus Meins.

Second Childhood was partially remade as Kiddie Kure, featuring much of the same cast.

Cast

The Gang
 Darla Hood as Darla
 Eugene Lee as Porky
 George McFarland as Spanky
 Carl Switzer as Alfalfa
 Billie Thomas as Buckwheat
 Dickie De Nuet as Our Gang member

Additional cast
 Sidney Bracey as Hobson, the butler
 Gretta Gould as Maid
 Zeffie Tilbury as Grandma

See also
 Our Gang filmography

References

External links

1936 films
1936 comedy films
1936 short films
American black-and-white films
Films directed by Gus Meins
Hal Roach Studios short films
Our Gang films
1930s American films
Films about hypochondriasis
Films about birthdays
1930s English-language films